Quasipaa verrucospinosa is a species of frog in the family Dicroglossidae. It is found in Laos, Vietnam, and Yunnan, China. It occurs in and around streams (its breeding habitat) in hill and lower montane evergreen forests. It is believed to be relatively common, but it is threatened by collection for consumption and—presumably—habitat loss driven by logging, causing degradation of forest habitat and stream sedimentation.

References

verrucospinosa
Frogs of China
Amphibians of Laos
Amphibians of Vietnam
Amphibians described in 1937
Taxa named by René Léon Bourret
Taxonomy articles created by Polbot